is a railway station in the city of Hachinohe, Aomori Prefecture, Japan, operated by East Japan Railway Company (JR East).

Lines
Naganawashiro Station is served by the Hachinohe Line, and is 3.4 kilometers from the terminus of the line at Hachinohe Station.

Station layout
The station has a single ground-level side platform serving one bi-directional track. There is a small rain shelter built on top of the platform, but there is no station building. The station is unattended.

History
Naganawashiro Station opened on June 1, 1934, as a station on the Japanese Government Railways (JGR). With the privatization of Japanese National Railways (JNR, the successor to JGR) on April 1, 1987, it came under the operational control of JR East. Automatic ticket machines were installed in February 2006.

Surrounding area
Mabechi River

See also
 List of railway stations in Japan

External links

  

Hachinohe
Hachinohe Line
Railway stations in Japan opened in 1934
Railway stations in Aomori Prefecture
Stations of East Japan Railway Company